The Clifford executive council was the 19th executive council of British Ceylon. The government was led by Governor Hugh Clifford.

Executive council members

See also
 Cabinet of Sri Lanka

References

1925 establishments in Ceylon
1927 disestablishments in Ceylon
Cabinets established in 1925
Cabinets disestablished in 1927
Ceylonese executive councils
Ministries of George V